This is a list of British Columbia Hockey League seasons since the league's inception in 1961.

History
The British Columbia Hockey League (BCHL) was founded as the Okanogan-Mainland Junior "A" Hockey League (OMJHL) in 1961 by the owners of four regional Junior B teams, though it would quickly expand out of the Okanogan and into Metro Vancouver and Vancouver Island, causing it to be renamed the British Columbia Junior Hockey League in 1967.

The BCJHL was considered a Tier II Junior A league by the now-defunct Canadian Amateur Hockey Association, which made them ineligible to play for the Memorial Cup. Instead, the champion of the BCJHL would play the champions of other rival Tier II leagues in BC, such as the Pacific Junior A Hockey League, for the Mowat Cup, then face the Alberta Champion for the Doyle Cup and the right to represent the Pacific region for the Centennial/Royal Bank Cup in the national championship. (Since then, the Mowat Cup is automatically awarded to the BCHL champions as there are no longer any other Junior A leagues in BC, and the Doyle Cup has been replaced with the. Western Canada Cup)

The 1986 Penticton Knights were the first team from the BCHL to win the national championship; The first of twelve championships captured by BCHL teams. The Vernon Vipers have held the most national titles in Canada with six. Other BCHL franchises that have won national championships include the South Surrey Eagles, Burnaby Express, Kelowna Spartans, Richmond Sockeyes, and West Kelowna Warriors, all with one apiece. The Warriors were the most recent BCHL team to win the Royal Bank Cup, winning their first ever national championship in 2016.

The BCHL has produced a number of high-profile NHL players; The most prolific of those being Brett Hull, who played for Penticton during his tenure. Other notable BCHL graduates that played in the NHL include Chuck Kobasew, Carey Price, Kyle Turris, Scott Gomez, Andrew Ladd and Willie Mitchell.

BCHL Seasons

As the Okanogan-Mainline Junior "A" Hockey League (OMJHL)
1961-62 | 1962-63

As the Okanogan Junior Hockey League (OJHL)
1963-64 | 1964-65 | 1965-66 | 1966-67

As the British Columbia Junior Hockey League (BCJHL)
1967-68 | 1968-69 | 1969-70 | 1970-71 | 1971-72 | 1972-73 | 1973-74 | 1974-75 | 1975-76 | 1976-77 | 1977-78 | 1978-79 | 1979-80 | 1980-81 | 1981-82 | 1982-83 | 1983-84 | 1984-85 | 1985-86 | 1986-87 | 1987-88 | 1988-89 | 1989-90

As the British Columbia Hockey League (BCHL)
1990-91 | 1991-92 | 1992-93 | 1993-94 | 1994-95 | 1995-96 | 1996-97 | 1997-98 | 1998-99 | 1999-00 | 2000-01 | 2001-02 | 2002-03 | 2003-04 | 2004-05 | 2005-06 | 2006-07 | 2007-08 | 2008-09 | 2009-10 | 2010-11 | 2011-12 | 2012-13 | 2013-14 | 2014-15 | 2015-16 | 2016-17 | 2017-18 | 2018-19 | 2019-20  | 2020-21 |

See also
British Columbia Hockey League
Canadian Junior Hockey League
Mowat Cup
Doyle Cup
Western Canada Cup
Royal Bank Cup